The Battle of Šumatovac or Battle of Aleksinac happened in 1876, in central Serbia, near the town of Aleksinac. The outnumbered Serbian army, led by colonel Kosta Protić, won a tactical victory in this defensive battle against the Ottoman forces. In a major tactical blunder the Ottomans spent a whole day frontally attacking a well-entrenched pentagonal redoubt defended by two Serbian battalions armed with muzzle-loading rifles and 6 cannons supported by about 40 additional artillery pieces positioned on the overlooking hills. The result is disputed, with some sources claiming Serbian victory, and  some sources claiming Ottoman Victory.

Notes

References

Sumatovac
Battles of the Ottoman–Serbian Wars
19th century in Serbia
1876 in the Ottoman Empire
Nišava District
1876 in Europe
1876 in Serbia
Serbian–Turkish Wars (1876–1878)